The FIS Freestyle World Ski Championships 2009 were held between March 2 and March 8 in Inawashiro, Japan.

Results

Men's Results

Skicross

Moguls

Dual Moguls

Aerials

Halfpipe

Women's Events

Skicross

Moguls

Dual Moguls

Aerials

Halfpipe

Medal table

External links 
2009 FIS Freestyle World Ski Championships official website 

2009
2009 in freestyle skiing
International sports competitions hosted by Japan
2009 in Japanese sport
Freestyle skiing competitions in Japan
Sports competitions in Fukushima Prefecture